George William Coventry, 11th Earl of Coventry (born 25 January 1934; died 14 June 2002 in Málaga, Spain) was a British hereditary peer and politician of the Conservative Party.

Life and career 
Coventry was the fourth child and only son of George Coventry, 10th Earl of Coventry (1900-1940) and Nesta Donne Philips (1903–1997). He inherited the title Earl of Coventry at the age of six, when his father was killed in action during the Battle of Wytschaete on 27 May 1940.

He attended Stowe School in Buckinghamshire and Eton College. On 21 March 1956 he took his seat in the House of Lords. He worked as stock broker, fashion designer, merchant and director of an oil company. He supported John Major, after joining the Conservative Party in the 1990s. He lost his seat in the House of Lords by the House of Lords Act 1999 and did not compete for one of the remaining seats.

Family 

Coventry was married four times:

 He married Marie Medhart on 22 March 1955, the daughter of William Medhart. The couple divorced in 1963. 
 He married Ann Cripps on 5 December 1969 and divorced in 1975.
 He married Valerie Ann Birch on 29 November 1980 and divorced in 1988. 
 Finally, he married Rachel Wynne Mason on 4 July 1992.

He died in June 2002 at the age of 68 years. The title was inherited by his 89-year-old cousin Francis Coventry, 12th Earl of Coventry (1912–2004), because his son of the first marriage Edward Coventry, Viscount Deerhurst had previously died in 1997 .

External links 
 George Coventry, 11th Earl of Coventry. Article on thepeerage

References 

1934 births
2002 deaths
People educated at Eton College
Earls of Coventry
20th-century English nobility
People educated at Stowe School
Coventry